The shortjaw leatherjacket (Oligoplites refulgens), also known as the slender leatherjacket, is a marine ray-finned fish from the family Carangidae which is native to the eastern Pacific, where it is found from Mexico to Ecuador. This species was formally described in 1904 by Charles Henry Gilbert & Edwin Chapin Starks from a type locality of Panama City market.

References

Shortjaw
Fish of the Pacific Ocean
Fish described in 1904
IUCN Red List least concern species